Jeffrey E. Jacobson (born August 19 in the Bronx, New York). Jacobson is a member of the Bars of the State of New York  and District of Columbia.  He is a notable lawyer within the entertainment and intellectual property fields.

Education
Jacobson received a B.A. in philosophy from Fordham University in 1976, and his J.D. from New York Law School in 1980, where he won the ASCAP Nathan Burkan Memorial Competition for his article "Copyright and Fair Use: Considerations in Written Works."  He was selected as a "Super Lawyer" in intellectual property for nine years in a row, an honor that is reserved for the top 5% of attorneys in the New York Metropolitan area.

Music
Prior to becoming an attorney Jacobson managed several music groups.  The Squirrels in 1978 and The Leeves were among those.  Jacobson also formed Squirrel Productions, Ltd. He was a consultant to a record company, Orange Records.  Additionally, he served as President of the music publishing firm, Aldous Demian Enterprises, Ltd.

Law
Upon graduating from law school, Jacobson worked for the performing rights organization SESAC, Inc.  Then, from 1985 until 2010, he served as an attorney and managing partner at Jacobson & Colfin, P.C., where his clients included Mick Taylor from the Rolling Stones, Juan Luis Guerra, David Cassidy, and Marty Balin.

Jacobson is currently President of The Jacobson Firm, P.C., a law firm that specializes in trademarks, copyrights, intellectual property, and entertainment law. The firm works with individuals and corporations within the sports and entertainment industry, in addition to esports, creative and visual arts, video, music, jewelry, magazines, fashion, photography, multimedia, games, television and internet industries.

A few of his notable cases include Nester's Map & Guide Corp. v. Hagstrom Map Company.  Where it was debated whether or not Nester's New York City taxi driver's guide Official New York Taxi Driver's Guide was entitled to copyright protections.  The case served as an important precedent for future decisions.  Additionally, Jacobson was responsible for securing a Temporary Restraining Order against Spike Lee's production company "30 Acres and a Mule" for the movie School Daze.  Jacobson also appeared before the New York Supreme Court Appellate Court in Barbara Kemper p/k/a Barbara Powell V. Ralph J. Donofrio a/k/a Kash Monet, and Jonathan Holtzman and John Brielle, d/b/a Brielle Music.  He also appeared before the Second Circuit Court of Appeals in The Video Trip Corporation v. Lightning Video, Inc.

Jacobson taught music business contracts for a decade at Five Towns College, and several years at the Institute of Audio Research. He is currently an adjunct associate professor at Hunter College and taught Advanced Music Business at Ramapo College of New Jersey.  Additionally, he has guest lectured at the American Guild of Authors and Composers, the Songwriter's Guild, the Center for Media Arts, Fordham University, St. John's Law School, Pace University School of Law, the Detroit School of Law, Touro Law School, the American Federation of Musicians, New York Law School, the Mid-America Music Conference, The College Music Journal Conference, Philadelphia Music Conferences, and the Black Radio Exclusive Conference.

Memberships
Jacobson has served on the New York City Bar Entertainment Law Committee, Trademark and Unfair Competition Committee, Copyright and Literary Property Law Committee, Media and Communications Law Committee, on several CLE faculties and their special N2K Task Force.  He was also Chairman of the Broadcasting, Sound Recordings and Performing Artists Committee in the Intellectual Property Law section of the American Bar Association.  He has also participated on various panels including the ABA Connection's "Seeking Harmony in Music Distribution." He currently serves on the Communications and Media Law Committee of the Association of the Bar of the City of New York.

In addition to serving as a Trustee for the Copyright Society of the United States of America, he serves on the editorial board for the Journal of the Copyright Society of the United States of America for nearly four decades beginning in 1989.  Jacobson has also been a contributor and editor to many periodicals including the New York Law Journal, Fordham University Law School Entertainment Law Review, Show Business, St. John's Law Review, European Intellectual Property Review, Copyright World, Journal of the Copyright Society of the US, Music Management & International Promotion Magazine, The Nebula Music Magazine and CMJ New Music Report.

Clients (Former and Present)

 Mick Taylor
 Juan Luis Guerra 
 David Cassidy
 Marty Balin
 John Luongo
 John Kaizan Neptune
 Vaneese Thomas
 Sly & Robbie
 Spyro Gyra
 Inner Circle
 Norton Records
 Freddie McGregor
 Israel Vibration
 Johnny Winter
 The New Riders of The Purple Sage
 Masters at Work
 Laurel Dewitt
 R.O.I.R. Records
 Segue
 VP Records
 Le Vian Corporation
 Judith Ripka Jewelry
 Buffalo Chip Campgrounds
 Esquire Bank
 The Jewelers Vigilance committee
 Kicks Books

Notoriety
 "Who's Who in America"
 "Who's Who in the World"
 Who's Who in American Law"
 "Who's Who in Entertainment"
 "Who's Who of Emerging Leaders in America"
 "Who's Who in the East"
 "Who's Who Lifetime Achievement Award"

Publications
 Copyright and Fair Use: Considerations in Written Works
 Book Review: State Trademark & Unfair Competition Law by U.S. Trademark Association
 Jewelry Law Update
 Some Trademark Basics
 Music and Copyrights
 How to Avoid Getting Screwed in a Work-For-Hire Job—or How to Keep Your CopyRIGHTS
 Book Review: Copyright Law Deskbook by Robert W. Clarida
 Music and the Internet: Some Thoughts from a Copyright Perspective
 Producer's Agreements
 Indemnification Clauses
 How Record Companies Reduce Their Royalty Obligations
 Unraveling the Mystery Behind Record Royalties
 NARAS, NY Chapter Newsletter
 How to Register Your Copyright
 What Indemnification Clauses Mean to You
 Personal Compact Disc Copying
 Trademark Law Basics
 The Law of Copyright (Book Review)
 Copyright Principles, Law and Practice (Book Review)
 Trademarks & Copyright, Wizard: The Comics Magazine #43

Professional Awards
 Martindale-Hubbell 25 Years of "Av Preeminent (R)"
 Super Lawyers 2014, 2015, 2016, 2017, 2018, 2019, 2020, 2021, 2022 NYC
 Av Rated
 NARAS Certificates of Appreciation, 2005, 2008

References

External links
 http://mi2n.com/press.php3?press_nb=154249
 https://www.avvo.com/attorneys/10016-ny-jeffrey-jacobson-1802532.html
 http://repositorio.uchile.cl/bitstream/handle/2250/139612/Copyright_Tradition_in_Latin.pdf?sequence=3
 https://atomicavenue.com/atomic/issue/334684/Wizard-The-Comics-Magazine-43

American lawyers
1956 births
Living people